The West Palm Beach Tropics were one of the eight original franchises that began play in the Senior Professional Baseball Association in 1989.  The club hired Dick Williams as manager and fielded a lineup that included slugger Dave Kingman and Rollie Fingers.  The Tropics went 52-20 in the regular season and ran away with the Southern Division title.  Ron Washington led the club's offense, hitting .359 with a league-high 73 RBI.  Mickey Rivers hit .366 and Kingman added 8 homers.  The pitching staff was led by Juan Eichelberger, who went 11-5 with a 2.90 ERA.  Tim Stoddard also won 10 games for the club. 

Local Valentino Falcone (a former minor leaguer) ruptured a hamstring stealing second base (one game before opening day) depriving him of an eventual roster spot. 

Despite their regular season dominance, the Tropics lost 12-4 to the St. Petersburg Pelicans in the SPBA's initial championship game.  

The West Palm Beach Tropics returned for a second season, as a traveling team known as the Florida Tropics, however the team ceased operation when the league folded in December 1990.

Attendance

The Tropics also had the league's best attendance record.  A crowd of 3,404 showed up for opening night, an 8-1 victory over the St. Lucie Legends, and the average draw over 35 home dates settled at a respectable 1,600. 

Unfortunately, the estimated break-even point for every franchise was 2,000 per game. Five of the league's eight teams did not get even half that figure. 

The initial WPB team owners, future Florida Marlins and Boston Red Sox owner John Henry and Boca Raton lawyer Don Sider, sold the Tropics after the first season, convinced the league would fail in its attempt to expand to California and Arizona.  New York theatrical producer Mitch Maxwell purchased the club but never completed financial requirements with the league and tried to sell the team back to Henry.  The former home of the tropics, Municipal Stadium, was later demolished and is now a Home Depot.

Coaches and staff

Manager and coaches
Manager: Dick Williams
Coaches: Bob Fralick, Ed Rakow, Larry Brown

Front Office
Ken Shepard, Vice President of Operations / Manager (died 2014)
Ken Burlew, Asst. Dir. of Operations
Michelle Jaminet, Vice President of Marketing
Dale Patten, Ticket Manager
Frank Calieri, Marketing Assistant

Notable players

 Benny Ayala
 Pete Broberg
 Ray Burris
 Doug Capilla
 Mike Easler
 Juan Eichelberger
 Rollie Fingers
 Toby Harrah
 Al Hrabosky
 Randy Johnson
 Ron Johnson
 Odell Jones
 Dave Kingman
 Lee Lacy
 Gary Lance
 Tito Landrum
 Renie Martin
 Will McEnaney
 Paul Mirabella
 Sid Monge
 Dan Norman
 Lowell Palmer
 Luis Pujols
 Ed Rakow
 Mickey Rivers
 Rodney Scott
 Tim Stoddard
 Tom Underwood
 Mark Wagner
 Ron Washington
 Jerry White

References

West Palm Beach, Florida
Senior Professional Baseball Association teams
1989 establishments in Florida
1990 disestablishments in Florida
Sports in Palm Beach County, Florida
Baseball teams established in 1989
Baseball teams disestablished in 1990
Defunct baseball teams in Florida